Ștefan C. Arteni (September 21, 1947 – April 1, 2020) was a Romanian artist, painter, calligrapher, architect, historian, essayist, and translator. His work focused on east Asian calligraphy, as well as secular and religious paintings.

Early life 
Arteni was born on September 21, 1947, in Bucharest, Romania, to Constanța Arteni and Vasile Arteni, a physician who specialized in otorhinolaryngology. Ștefan grew up primarily in Bucharest, and as a teenager was introduced to eastern Asian characters and letters while watching the movie Harakiri (1962) on his black-and-white family television set. Eastern Asian characters and letters piqued his curiosity and he discovered a passion, deep respect and understanding for the oriental arts, symbols, and calligraphy. In a letter to his close friend Michael Finkenthal, he expressed the impact this experience had on him, and how it influenced his style and later work:My interest in calligraphy began in high school. My Japanization - he wrote - began with that black-and-white film Harakiri, seen in the motherland: every image perfectly composed and especially... the ritual. I was profoundly impressed by the perfect composition of each image. Many scenes suggest a wonderful calligraphic dance. In terms of its content, the motion picture draws attention to the performative qualities of ritual.
After attending the Nicolae Tonitza High School of Fine Arts between 1961 and 1965, he was denied admission to a Fine Arts program in the state-run university system because his liberal parents were considered politically unreliable by Nicolae Ceaușescu's regime. As a result, he studied architecture at the Ion Mincu University of Architecture and Urban Planning, from which he graduated in 1970.

His early life was profoundly impacted by the communist regime in Romania under Ceaușescu's administration. Due to the harsh conditions under by the communist party, upon completion of his studies in 1971, Arteni's parents' graduation gift was a trip to Paris to study the city's great museums. However, his parents' real intentions were to flee Romania and remain in exile. As such, they escaped Romania in 1971 and sought political asylum in Rome, Italy, due to cultural and financial reasons.

Arteni never returned to his native land, but the imprint of the country never left his sense of self.

After a few weeks, in 1971 at the age of 24, Arteni enrolled in the Accademia di Belle Arti di Roma, where he studied with Luigi Montanarini and Sandro Trotti, both celebrated painters. On the very first day of class he met Myriam Sánchez Posada, a fellow student from Colombia. They became inseparable and married in 1975. In the words of Arteni, "together we wandered into the labyrinth of art".

At this point in his career, Arteni increased his emphasis on abstract forms in his painting, while continuing his exploration of line, color, and composition.

In Rome, between 1972 and 1974 he thoroughly explored Italian painting and art and worked for the Romanian broadcast of Vatican Radio as a redactor and art historian. He wrote, produced, and broadcast 61-episode series on Christian Art in Europe. In this time period, he exhibited some of his first works and published some of the results of the research he and Myriam made on materials and techniques of painting, authoring over 40 papers published by the International Council of Museums, on techniques, individual artists, materials and the theory of art. These investigations were presented in the form of scientific papers at various international conferences, and are currently being used in several European teaching institutions.

In 1977, Arteni and his wife Myriam, herself an award-winning painter and skilled fine art book-maker, left Rome and moved to New York City, where they established themselves and lived together for the remainder of his life until his death in 2020 at the age of 72, due to a sudden and aggressive form of cancer.

Career 
Arteni continued his informal studies of art at several universities in New York, but as a formal student he studied at Chinese, Korean, and Japanese calligraphy. He pursued his education in art history, fine arts, icon and mural painting, and the restitution and conservation of architectural monuments.

Arteni became a student of Tanaka Setsuzan, a Living Master and President of the Nihon Shodo Geijutsu Kyokai (the Japanese Calligraphy Art Association), founded by Kamijo Shinzan, one of the greatest calligraphers of Japan.

He pursued studies in architecture, art, history, fine arts, icon and mural painting, and the restitution and conservation of architectural monuments. He was also proficient in several languages including Romanian, English, Spanish, French, Italian, Japanese, Russian, Latin, Greek, and German.

Building upon Hesychast and Zen spirituality, Ștefan Arteni, who sometimes used the sobriquet Kyosen (Crazy Hermit), also taught calligraphy: dwelling in art, stilling the mind, enstasis and meditation with the brush.

Arteni described the process of painting as second-order cybernetics in action. The appropriate epistemology is constructivist. The ludic ritual act of the performance event creates form.

Arteni's work echoes the myth of Ulysses, it is a quest leading the artist to address the intersection of art and meditative spirituality at the heart of form.

Awards 
In 2005, Arteni was awarded the highest rank in Japanese calligraphy, the title of Shihan, an honorific title used to refer to Master Teachers or masters of a specific style. He is the only non-Japanese artist to earn the title, to date. According to the ancient custom, along with his promotion to the rank of master came the bestowing of a new calligraphy name, Geizan, which translates from Japanese as "Art Mountain". The name was given to Arteni by Tanaka Setsuzan.

During this period, Arteni was also the first western artist to be awarded the title of Master Seal Carver. His seals have been favorably compared to Qi Baishi's, the President of the China Artists Association, whose artistic style showed no signs of western influence.

In competitions organized by the Japan Calligraphic Art Academy in Tokyo and the Japan Calligraphy Center in Los Angeles, Arteni was awarded the Japan Foreign Minister's Grand Prize for Calligraphy in 1996 and 2005, the Silver Award for Kana in 1999, and the Grand Prize for Calligraphy of the Japanese Consul in 2002.

Works 

Arteni has extensively exhibited calligraphies and paintings throughout Europe, the United States and in Japan, Korea, China and Taiwan, with over 50 exhibitions. His works are in numerous prestigious private, public and corporate collections. In addition, Arteni frequently provided demonstrations and lectures on many aspects of his work. He participated in numerous international conferences and expositions over the years.

Publications and lecture demonstrations 
Since 1974, Arteni has authored over one-hundred radio broadcasts and published papers on art history, the manufacture of artist's materials, the techniques and materials of painting, and aesthetics (phenomenology and systems theory).

He has participated in the Congresses of the International Council of Museums (Committee for Conservation), the Deutsches Farbenzentrum, the Chinese Society for Aesthetics, ICMS8 (Gestes, formes et processus signifiants en musique et semiotique interarts), and in numerous other international Symposia and Conferences. Arteni has also participated in the Conferences of and chaired the I.S.F. Section "Lipids in Art" in the United States, England, and France.

In recent years, he has lectured on and demonstrated calligraphy (Greek, Sanskrit, Chinese, and Japanese), and participated in workshops in New York (1995 and 1996); the Freeman Center for East Asian Studies at Wesleyan University, Middletown, CT (1998); Columbia University, New York (1998); and Saint Mark Library, General Theological Seminary, New York (1999).

He concentrated his research on the pictorial fact and procedural switches between formal contextures, the ludic ritual act of performance event that creates a form-space, art communication as a high-context process, the mereotopology of formal constructs, metacultural sensibility and complexity theory, and the complementarity of painting and calligraphy.

Arteni is also the first Western artist to master the art of seal cutting and is co-founder of Sol Invictus Press (sol invictus means invincible sun, which is a reference to the last Roman god before the Christianization of the Roman Empire). Many of their creations have been included in the Bodleian Library at Oxford University. These works extensively detailed Arteni's fascination and love of calligraphy from different cultures.

He has also pioneered the art of sumi ink monoprinting and large-size seal cutting, and has explored and expanded the horizon of clay monoprinting. In addition to painting and calligraphy, Arteni demonstrated his excellence in drawing, printmaking and collage. He also expanded his art into new materials, including alkyds, gouache, watercolor and red seal paste.

His limited-edition published books have been widely exhibited:

Arteni's stylistic matrix consists of the interplay of Byzantine tradition, Western formal procedures, and Far Eastern calligraphy and seal-carving methods, a simultaneous plurality of interwoven recursive and permutative differences.

References 

1947 births
2020 deaths
Artists from Bucharest
20th-century Romanian historians
21st-century Romanian historians
20th-century Romanian male artists
21st-century Romanian male artists
20th-century Romanian painters
21st-century Romanian painters
Romanian architects
Romanian essayists
Romanian translators
Romanian emigrants to the United States
Deaths from cancer in New York (state)